Thomas Vincent Miller Jr. (December 3, 1942 – January 15, 2021), known as Mike Miller, was an American politician from Maryland. He had been a state senator representing the 27th District (Calvert, Charles, and Prince George's Counties) from 1975 to 2020 and served as its President from 1987 to 2020. He was the longest-serving President of the Maryland Senate, and was for a period the longest-serving state senate president in the United States.

Early life and education
Miller was born in Clinton, Maryland on December 3, 1942, the first of ten siblings, and attended Surrattsville High School. He studied at the University of Maryland, College Park where he was a member of Phi Sigma Kappa, and graduated with a B.S. in business administration in 1964. Miller went on to graduate from the University of Maryland School of Law in 1967 with an LL.B. degree. Miller was admitted to the Maryland Bar in 1967.

Career
In 1971, he was elected to the Maryland House of Delegates from the third legislative district of Maryland in Prince George's County, and served in that position until his election to the state senate in 1975.

The Senate office building in Annapolis was named after him due to his being the longest-serving Senate president in the history of the state legislature.

The Main Administration Building at his alma mater, the University of Maryland, College Park, was named after him on June 29, 2020. He was known as a tireless advocate for higher education institutions in Maryland and the building's official moniker was the "Thomas V. Miller Administration Building."

Miller was featured in the Netflix documentary The Keepers for his opposition to a bill seeking to increase the statute of limitations for sexual abuse victims.

On October 24, 2019, he announced he would step down from his leadership post, citing fatigue caused by his cancer treatment. He has stated that he intended to serve out the remainder of his term in the state Senate.

On December 23, 2020, he announced his resignation from the senate, citing health reasons.

Personal life
Miller was married; he and his wife lived in Chesapeake Beach and had five children, a son and four daughters.

In January 2019, Miller disclosed that he had been diagnosed with prostate cancer in July 2018 and underwent prescribed medication treatment; in December 2018 he underwent chemotherapy after the cancer was found to have progressed. Miller died at home in Chesapeake Beach from the effects of the disease on January 15, 2021.

References

External links
Senator Mike Miller official website
Maryland Senate - Senate President official government website
Bills sponsored  2008  2008  2007  2006  2005  2004  2003  2002  2001  2000  1999  1998
Project Vote Smart - Senator Thomas V. 'Mike' Miller Jr. (MD) profile
Follow the Money - Thomas V. (Mike) Miller Jr
2006 2004 2002 1998 campaign contributions

|-

|-

1942 births
2021 deaths
20th-century American politicians
21st-century American politicians
Deaths from cancer in Maryland
Deaths from prostate cancer
Maryland lawyers
Democratic Party Maryland state senators
People from Calvert County, Maryland
People from Clinton, Maryland
Presidents of the Maryland State Senate
University of Maryland Francis King Carey School of Law alumni
University of Maryland, College Park alumni